Jagoldai (Tatar Turkic:  Cağolday, Cağalday) (pronounce: yah-gohl-DAI or jah-ghahl-DAY) – little Tatar Turkic tyumen (duchy) in today Kursk Oblast and Belgorod Oblast of Russia as well as the Sloboda Ukraine, vassal of the Grand Duchy of Lithuania in 15th–16th century.

It was founded in 1438 by Tatars of Golden Horde.

See also 
Turkic peoples
Timeline of Turks (500-1300)
List of Turkic dynasties and countries

References

States and territories established in 1438